= Mmino wa Setšo =

Mmino wa Setšo is a musical tradition of Northern Sotho-speaking communities in South Africa. It is a performative tradition in which singing, dancing and instrumental playing are important elements.

== Etymology ==
The Northern Sotho term mmino wa setšo refers broadly to music of origin or traditional music. The word mmino refers to a musical or performative activity, while setšo relates to culture, origin or tradition. The term is therefore used to describe indigenous musical practices associated with Northern Sotho communities.

According to Mapaya, mmino wa setšo should be understood through the ideas and experiences of the people who practise it. His study used interviews, observations and discussions with practitioners to describe the tradition from a Northern Sotho perspective.

== Forms ==
Mmino wa Setšo includes three main forms: instrumental playing, singing and dancing. These forms can occur separately, but they are also closely connected during performances. Song and dance are particularly important parts of the tradition.

Traditional instruments are used to accompany performances. Among the musical practices associated with Northern Sotho communities are the playing of pipes and drums. The instruments and styles used have changed over time as performers have adapted to new materials and circumstances.

== Kiba and Dinaka ==
Kiba is one of the musical and dance genres associated with mmino wa setšo. Research by Deborah James describes kiba as part of a wider family of traditional Sotho musical practices. The term mmino wa setšo has been used by performers and others to refer to this broader musical tradition.

Dinaka, which refers to pipes used in certain performances, are particularly associated with kiba. Research describes groups of performers playing pipes of different pitches together to create melodies. Drums are also used to accompany the dancing.

== Cultural significance ==
Mmino wa Setšo forms part of the cultural expression of Northern Sotho-speaking communities. It provides a way for performers to communicate through song, movement and musical instruments. It has also been connected to social relationships, community activities and expressions of cultural identity.

The tradition has continued to change as communities have experienced migration and contact with other musical styles. James's research shows that kiba, as part of the wider traditional music tradition, developed beyond its rural origins and became associated with migrant communities in South Africa.

== Contemporary practice ==
Although mmino wa setšo is rooted in traditional practices, it has not remained unchanged. Performers have adapted instruments, performance settings and musical practices while retaining indigenous elements. This has allowed the tradition to continue within changing Northern Sotho communities.
